Azmatgarh is a town and a nagar panchayat in Azamgarh district in the state of Uttar Pradesh, India.

Schools in Azmatgarh 

Children Public School  is situated near Goga Bhikhi Chowk Azmatgarh which is one of the oldest school in Azmatgarh. Children Public School  was established in 2000.The school run in both English Medium (CBSE Board) as well as Hindi Medium (UP Board). It is an English Medium Co-Educational Institute.

Festivals
Common Indian Festivals such as Holi, Diwali, Durga Puja, Vijayadashami,Ram Navami, Eid are celebrated with great pomp and show in the city.

Demographics
Azmatgarh is situated near jiyanpur, It is 4 kilometer east to jiyanpur, & 22.4 km from district headquarter Azamgarh

 India census, Azmatgarh had the population of 18101, but as per the UP government website Azmatgarh had population of 23,483 . Males constitute 50% of the population and females 50%. Azmatgarh has an average literacy rate of 72%, lower than the national average of 75.5%; with 85% of the males and 70% of females literate. 21% of the population is under 6 years of age.

References

Cities and towns in Azamgarh district